Charles Maingon (12 October 1942 – 24 September 2018) was a French and Canadian judoka and university professor who won gold at the 1969 Canadian National Judo Championships and represented Canada at the 1969 and 1971 World Judo Championships in the -70 kg category. He and Vincent Grifo, who won the National Championship in his own weight category the same year as Maingon, were the first Canadian Champions from Quebec.

Maingon was born in Paris, France and moved to Montreal with his family in 1959 at the age of 17. He started practicing judo while still in France but most of his training took place in Canada. He was promoted to sankyu (third kyu) at Seidokwan Academy of Judo under Fred Okimura in 1961, shodan (first dan) in 1964 at Club de judo Hakudokan under Raymond Damblant, and refused further promotion after reaching yondan (fourth dan). He was the long-time technical director at the Cloverdale Judo Club in Kingston, Ontario and travelled to Montreal on a near-weekly basis to practice at Hakudokan.

Maingon completed a bachelor's degree at McGill University (1967) and master's and PhD degrees (1969 and 1972, supervised by David J. Niederauer) at the University of British Columbia, all in French Literature. He became a professor of French Studies after finishing his PhD, first at Royal Roads Military College in Colwood, British Columbia, then at the Royal Military College of Canada in Kingston from 1970 until he retired in 2000. His PhD thesis and several of his publications focus on the work of French novelist and art critic Joris-Karl Huysmans.

Selected publications

See also
Judo in Ontario
Judo in British Columbia
Judo in Quebec
Judo in Canada
List of Canadian judoka

References

1942 births
2018 deaths
Canadian male judoka
Royal Military College of Canada people
Historians of French literature
Sportspeople from Paris